George McCall Theal (11 April 1837, Saint John, New Brunswick – 17 April 1919, Wynberg, Cape Town), was the most prolific and influential South African historian, archivist and genealogist of the late nineteenth and early twentieth century.

Life history

The son of Canadian physician William Young Theal, who wanted him to become an Episcopalian minister, Theal left home early, sailing with his uncle, Captain Francis Peabody Leavitt, and lived briefly in the United States and Sierra Leone before emigrating to South Africa. There he became a teacher but soon moved to journalism, publishing, and an unsuccessful stint as an amateur diamond miner, all in South African frontier communities. His career as a historian began with the publication of his Compendium of South African History and Geography in 1873 following his return to teaching.

Theal spent five years at the Lovedale Seminary outside Alice in the Eastern Cape, working amongst missionaries and Africans. Lovedale was an important institution in the early 1870s, being a non-sectarian and non-denominational theological seminary and Christian school, founded by Presbyterian missionaries in 1841. Lovedale's principal, Dr. James Stewart, attached great importance to the teaching of printing and bookbinding. In 1872 Stewart needed someone who could teach and manage the printing works – Theal was the man. He had taught first at an elementary school in Knysna and from 1867 at a public school in King William's Town, later to become Dale College Boys' High School. He had also been editor of three minor British Kaffrarian newspapers between 1862 and 1865, and later worked for the Kaffrarian Watchman in King William's Town, where he printed his first contribution South Africa As It Is in 1871. From King William's Town he had travelled to Du Toit's Pan, then seen as the richest diamond mine in the world, and was present when Britain raised the Union Jack over the area. Theal wrote some articles for the Diamond News and called the takeover "a most disastrous change". Having failed to make his fortune on the diamond fields, he returned to the Eastern Cape. Theal was a religious man, and thus believed that it was the civilised white man's duty to rescue the black man from ignorance and barbarism (in common with others of that period, he saw it in racial terms as well). This made him ready to accept the Lovedale post. 

While living in King William's Town, he read everything available on the history of South Africa and started on an outline of his own rendition which was a synthesis of all he had read. By 1875 at Lovedale he was teaching history, geography, English grammar and history of the Bible, and also being in charge of the printing department. He was responsible for the monthly publication of the Kaffir Express (later the Christian Express) and for the Xhosa version. The press published mainly religious and educational works. Between 1879 and 1882 Theal wrote a large number of articles for various periodicals on South African history. His knowledge of the Bantu was so extensive that in 1877 he was requested by Sir Bartle Frere to persuade some belligerent Bantu chiefs to moderate their attitude. Theal's success in this role led to his being offered a post in the Treasury. He accepted this position, aware that he would then have access to the State archives which were housed in the Surveyor-General's office.

Publications

South Africa As It Is (pamphlet, 1871 King William's Town)

Basutoland Records (3 vols. 1883 Cape Town)

The Republic of Natal (1886)

History of South Africa (5 vols. 1889–1900)
 with C.C. de Villiers
The Portuguese in South Africa (1896)
Belangrijke Historische Documenten (3 vols. 1896–1911, Cape Town)
Large number of documentary publications (1897–1905, London)
 (36 vols.)
Records of South-Eastern Africa (9 vols. 1898–1903)

Catalogue of Books and Pamphlets relating to Africa south of the Zambesi in the Collection of George McCall Theal (1912)
South Africa – Story of the Nations Series (1917, first edition in 1894)
Ethnography and Condition of South Africa before AD 1505 (1st of 11 vols. 1919)

See also
 Historiography of the British Empire# South Africa

Notes

Further reading
 Christopher Saunders, The Making of the South African Past: Major Historians on Race and Class (1988)

External links
 Kaffir Folk-Lore by George McCall Theal

1837 births
1919 deaths
Historians of South Africa
People from Qonce
Persons of National Historic Significance (Canada)
20th-century South African historians
Writers from Saint John, New Brunswick
19th-century South African historians